Chytonix palliatricula, the cloaked marvel moth, is a moth of the family Noctuidae. The species was first described by Achille Guenée in 1852. It is found in North America, where it has been recorded from southern Canada to the Gulf Coast. The range extends west into the Great Plains to Nebraska and Oklahoma in the south and Alberta and British Columbia in the north. It is also found in Mexico, Guatemala and Panama.

The wingspan is 28–33 mm. The forewings are olive, light grey, and dark grey with large grey spots and a black and white bar in the fold. Adults are on wing in late spring and summer.

The larvae probably feed on Poaceae species.

References

Moths described in 1852
Hadeninae
Moths of North America